Next Generation or Next-Generation may refer to:

Publications and literature 
 Next Generation (magazine), video game magazine that was made by the now defunct Imagine Media publishing company
 Next Generation poets (2004), list of young and middle-aged figures from British poetry

Technology 
Next generation often means a new state of the art:
 AMD Next Generation Microarchitecture (disambiguation), AMD products
 Next Generation Air Transportation System, the Federal Aviation Administration's massive overhaul of the national airspace system
 Next Generation Internet (disambiguation), various projects intended to drastically increase the speed of the Internet
 Next Generation Networking, emerging computer network architectures and technologies
 Next-generation lithography, lithography technology slated to replace photolithography beyond the 32 nm node
 Next-Generation Secure Computing Base, software architecture designed by Microsoft
 NextGen Healthcare Information Systems, develops software and systems to the healthcare industry
 The Next Generation of Genealogy Sitebuilding (TNG), a genealogy software title
 The upcoming generation of video game consoles at a given time
 Boeing 737 Next Generation, airliner
 REAL/NG, an operating system based on REAL/32 (formerly Multiuser DOS) and Linux from 2001 to 2003

Television 
 Degrassi: The Next Generation, Canadian television series
 Meerkat Manor The Next Generation, series 4 of Animal Planet's Meerkat Manor television series
 Roots: The Next Generations, miniseries and a sequel to the phenomenally popular miniseries Roots
 Speed Racer: The Next Generation, American animated television series based on the classic Japanese Speed Racer franchise
 Star Trek: The Next Generation, science fiction television series set in the Star Trek universe created by Gene Roddenberry
 "The Next Generation" (Star Trek: Picard), an episode of the third season of Star Trek: Picard

Music
 The Next Generation (album), a 2009 album by Sweetbox
 Next Generation (Gary Burton album)

See also 
 Generation Next (disambiguation)
 Nextgen (disambiguation)
 New Generation (disambiguation)
 TNG (disambiguation)